The Apocalypse demo is a 5 track death metal demo and the first release by Australian nu metal band Superheist It was their rarest recording (before it was re-released in 2018), as well as their earliest and heaviest. Apocalypse was released as a demo to record companies, radio stations, and magazines in 1994, a year after the creation of the band.
The demo was later remastered and re-released as a digital release on 27 April 2018.

The recording
The demo was recorded in mid to late 1994 by guitarist DW Norton and producer Mark Rachelle at Backbeach studio in Rye, Victoria It was later distributed on cassette through Warhead Records. The original Superheist logo was conceived by DW Norton and additional artwork and layout done by Cam Tucker.
This early recording is a good example of the extreme metal roots of a band that is mostly known for its nu-metal releases.

Track listing

(Notes) track 1 and 2 were released as hidden tracks on the Chrome Matrix EP.

Credits 
Superheist
Burger - vocals
Norton - guitar
Donut - bass guitar
Sean - drums
Fetah - Keyboards

Production
Mark, Burger and Norton - mixing
Superheist and Mark Rachelle - producer

Reviews
"The birth of Superheist! Fast & attacking metal sound right from the first beat. Heavy & in your face death growl vocals. Awesome production & tight musicianship. Featuring samples from the movie "Naked" starring David Thewlis. This debut cassette tape had a photocopied black & white cover & contained 5 tracks. Releases after this, bridged over to commercialism & it could be said even "pop" given the artwork on the cover of "The New Recruit" record. At the time of this release, Superheist were at the top of the food-chain in Australian metal. Hailing from Melbourne, this is, or was rather, a killer band which will be sorely missed. 4/5 " - Xirtam, 2009

References 

Superheist albums